Myroslav Dumanskyi (17 June 1929 – 1 April 1996) was a Soviet, and later Ukrainian, football player and coach.

Born in Ivano-Frankivsk Oblast, Ukrainian SSR, he played for numerous Soviet teams, until his retirement as a player in 1963. From then he became a coach, first in the Soviet leagues, and then in the independent Ukrainian league; he continued to coach until his death in 1996.

In 1956 Dumanskyi played a game for Ukraine at the Spartakiad of the Peoples of the USSR.

Myroslav Dumansky is the father of Yaroslav Dumanskyi.

References

External links
  Profile

1929 births
1996 deaths
People from Stanisławów Voivodeship
Soviet footballers
Ukrainian footballers
SKA Lviv players
FC Shakhtar Donetsk players
FC Spartak Ivano-Frankivsk players
Soviet football managers
Ukrainian football managers
FC Naftovyk Dolyna managers
FC Spartak Ivano-Frankivsk managers

Association football midfielders